Minnesota State Highway 110 (MN 110) was a short  connector state highway in Minnesota, which ran from an interchange with MN 55 in Mendota Heights to an interchange with Interstate 494 (I-494) in Inver Grove Heights, south of downtown Saint Paul.

On October 23, 2017, the Minnesota Department of Transportation (MnDOT) announced that MN 110 would be renamed as an extension of MN 62. MnDOT said the change was necessary to prevent confusion to visitors and residents. MN 62 signs went up in August 2018, while MN 110 signs were labelled "Old Highway 110" for one year after the switch.

Route description
MN 110 served as an east–west arterial highway between Mendota Heights, Mendota, West St. Paul, Sunfish Lake, and Inver Grove Heights. The highway was a four-lane divided highway with a total of seven stoplights for eastbound traffic and six westbound.

The highway had a major junction with I-35E in the center of Mendota Heights. The highway also had an interchange with Robert Street/Robert Trail (MN 3) in Inver Grove Heights. MN 110 paralleled I-494 throughout its route in Dakota County. It also had an interchange with I-494 at its eastern terminus in Inver Grove Heights. The western terminus of MN 110 was located near the confluence of the Minnesota and Mississippi rivers at the Mendota Bridge.

History
MN 110 was marked in 1965 and replaced the same route previously known as part of MN 100 from 1934 to 1965. This route was originally part of the MN 100 Beltway circling the entire Twin Cities during the 1940s and 1950s. It was paved before 1940 and constructed as a divided highway by 1953.

Before completion of the I-494 freeway in 1985, I-494 had a missing link for 20 years.  MN 110 had carried all I-494 traffic from its beginning at MN 55 in Mendota Heights, to the then-completed portion of I-494  at Babcock Trail in Inver Grove Heights. There was a traffic signal at this junction (where 3, MN 52, MN 110, and I-494 all intersected) for many years following completion of the nearby Lafayette Freeway (then marked MN 3, now US Highway 52). An interchange has since been constructed replacing this traffic signal.

After a resurfacing construction project in 2017, MnDOT announced that starting in 2018 the department would redesignate MN 110 to MN 62, providing one continuously-named highway that connects two ends of I-494.

Major intersections

References

External links

MN 110 at The Unofficial Minnesota Highways Page
110
Transportation in Dakota County, Minnesota